St Aubin railway station, also known as St Aubins was a railway station in Saint Aubin, a port in Jersey in the Channel Islands. Opened in 1870 by the Jersey Railway, it was in passenger operation until the line closed in 1936.

History
The Jersey Railway first opened in 1870, running services between Saint Helier and Saint Aubin with trains stopping at the three intermediate stations, First Tower, Millbrook and Beaumont. The first trial service ran on 28 September, and on the following day a train carrying 300 invited guests departed from Saint Helier. The line was formally opened to passengers on 17 October with a grand ceremonial opening followed by a banquet at Noirmont Manor, the residence of the contractor,  Mr E. Pickering. On the opening day, 4000 single journeys were made on the line.

The station as originally built had two platforms under a trainshed. A hotel opened at the station in 1871.

In 1885, a third platform was built to serve trains on the extension to Corbière.

In 1922 the trainshed was demolished due to its poor condition and replaced with canopies over the platforms.

Closure
On 15 October 1936, a fire damaged the station and destroyed most of the railway's rolling stock. The company sold all of its land and stations to the States of Jersey for £25,000 in 1937. The main station building and hotel are now Saint Brélade's parish hall.

References

External links 
 

Transport in Jersey
History of Jersey
Railway stations opened in 1870
Railway stations closed in 1936
Disused railway stations in the Channel Islands
1870 establishments in Jersey
1936 disestablishments in Jersey